is a Japanese web manga series written and illustrated by Shū Sakuratani. It has been serialized on Hero's Inc.'s Comiplex online manga website since December 2020.

Plot
Three years ago, mutant demons began appearing in Japan. While some are harmless or helpful towards humans, others are troublesome. Created from humans suffering from extreme emotional distress or unresolved trauma, these mutant demons began to wreak havoc as they began to evolve to be more intelligent and dangerous. 

A lone rooster named Keiji wanders around various cities of Japan while defeating mutant demons he encounters. His ultimate goal is to find and kill the mutant dubbed "The White Demon" who killed his sister in order to avenge her death.

Characters

Main characters

A self-described "migratory bird" who vows to defeat the demon that killed his sister. He wanders around Japan and has a policy to never stay longer than necessary. Keiji has a strict code of conduct that he follows regarding respect and appreciation. Despite despising children or any youngsters that he deemed disrespectful or annoying, he has a soft spot for some of them, like Piyoko. His abilities include resonance and having great aim when throwing items with his beak.

Raised by a yakuza to initially be sold with other chicks, Piyoko became a beloved pet instead before witnessing her owner turn into a mutant demon. Witnessing Keiji defeat and save her owner, she decides to follow him on his journey to defeat the White Demon and Keiji reluctantly let her join him after she helped nurse him back to health. She is attached to him, believing that she will marry him once she is older, and was given the name Piyoko by him after asking for a name. She has the word  written on her back after asking her former owner to give her a tattoo similar to his.

Adopted into a wealthy family shortly after her birth, Elizabeth lived a luxurious yet dissatisfying life when she witnessed a demon wreak havoc on her city and nearly killed her and her family. It was Keiji that rescued them and she immediately fell in love with him, only to be abandoned right after their short affair. She ended up resenting Keiji for abandoning her and initially trained herself to get revenge against him; however, as she witnessed more mutant demons kill off her loved ones after Keiji's departure, she began training to defeat them for the next six months. After reuniting with Keiji, she decides to join his efforts in fighting against the White Demon. Elizabeth fights with a lightning staff and is shown to be tech savvy.

Other characters

A one-eyed turtle with a personal vendetta against birds after witnessing them eat his siblings after hatching, he is initially hostile towards Keiji. However, he helps him defeat a demon at sea after realizing that Keiji was not like the seagulls he despised. He lets Keiji off to go avenge his sister but makes him promise that they will have a proper battle once he returns.

An elderly toucan taken from his home in Brazil and now overseeing the Southern Birds exhibit in the zoo, he took Keiji into the exhibit after finding him unconscious in the rain. He was a beloved member of the community and protected his bird family from a demon attack before succumbing to his injuries. Keiji took one of his feathers, hoping to return it to Zena's sisters one day.
   
Lisa and Sara are both sisters of Keiji. It is Lisa's death that led Keiji to avenge her; however, Keiji noted that the bird used by the White Demon resembles Sara, who was missing prior to Lisa's death. 
The White Demon
A white-skinned and four-horned demon. The mutant is responsible for killing Keiji's sister Lisa. The White Demon is a giant that also as a fire-like bird that it uses to burn what it wants. It also has a circular mark on its neck, which Keiji uses to identify it.

Publication
Rooster Fighter is written and illustrated by Shū Sakuratani. The series began on Hero's Inc.'s Comiplex online manga website on December 18, 2020. The series' first tankōbon volume was released on May 1, 2021. As of January 26, 2023, five volumes have been released.

The manga is licensed in North America by Viz Media. The manga is also licensed in Argentina and Spain by Editorial Ivrea and in Brazil and Mexico by Panini Comics.

Volume list

Reception
Since its premiere, Rooster Fighter has been popular abroad, especially in Spanish-speaking countries such as Mexico, Spain and Argentina. The manga received translation publication offers from more than 12 countries and regions.

References

External links
  
 

Action anime and manga
Chickens in popular culture
Comics about birds
Demons in anime and manga
Japanese webcomics
Kaiju
Parody anime and manga
Seinen manga
Shogakukan manga
Viz Media manga
Webcomics in print